Walk the Walk is a 1970 American exploitation film produced by Kroger Babb.  Released by Babb's Hallmark Productions company, it was written and directed by Jac Zacha. It tells the story of a young African-American man battling addiction to alcohol and heroin.

External links

1970 films
1970 drama films
Blaxploitation films
1970s exploitation films
American independent films
Hood films
American drama films
1970s English-language films
1970s American films